Mustafa Rugibani, is a Libyan businessman and politician who was born in 1941. He was named Labor Minister on 22 November 2011 by Abdurrahim El-Keib.

Prior to the uprising that toppled the Gaddafi government of Libya, Mr. Rugibani was CEO of MTS in Libya  and chairman of United Business Machines, the authorized IBM Business Partner for the entire range of IBM products and services in Jordan.

Mustafa Rugibani was appointed as Ambassador for Libya to the Holy See between 2013 up until 2017.

External links
 Interim Government Official website (Executive Office)

References
4. http://www.archivioradiovaticana.va/storico/2015/05/13/libya%E2%80%99s_ambassador_to_the_holy_see_on_migrants/en-1143881www.archivioradiovaticana.va.2015-05-13. Retrieved 24 April 2020.

Government ministers of Libya
Living people
Members of the National Transitional Council
Members of the Interim Government of Libya
Libyan businesspeople
Libyan Sunni Muslims
Year of birth missing (living people)